The Bökelbergstadion was a football stadium in Mönchengladbach, Germany.

History
It was the home of Bundesliga side Borussia Mönchengladbach before Borussia-Park opened in 2004. The stadium had a capacity of up to 34,500 people. The inauguration took place on 20 September 1919 under the name "Westdeutsches Stadion". The site's nickname then, was "de Kull" (the gravel-pit). The name "Bökelbergstadion" was established on 28 July 1962, after Borussia Mönchengladbach won the DFB-Pokal for the first time.  The stadium was demolished in August 2006. Construction of new residential buildings went ahead in 2007. The terraces of the former north and south curve as well as those of the main grandstand have been preserved and are now integrated into the surrounding residential area as a public green space. The former stadium structure is still clearly visible. On 2 December 2019 a memorial of the Bökelberg was unveiled on site.

External links 

Borussia Mönchengladbach official web site
The Online memorial

Defunct football venues in Germany
Demolished buildings and structures in Germany
Borussia Mönchengladbach
Defunct sports venues in Germany
Sports venues in North Rhine-Westphalia
Buildings and structures in Mönchengladbach
Sport in Mönchengladbach
Sports venues completed in 1919
1919 establishments in Germany